The 2009 Saskatchewan (SaskTel) Scotties Tournament of Hearts, Saskatchewan's women's provincial curling championship, was held January 28 – February 1 at the Swift Current Curling Club in Swift Current. The winner represents team Saskatchewan at the 2009 Scotties Tournament of Hearts in Victoria, British Columbia.

Teams

Draw brackets

A Event

B Event

C Event

Results

Draw 1
January 28, 1330

Draw 2
January 28, 1930

Draw 3
January 29, 0830

Draw 4
January 29, 1400

Draw 5
January 29, 1900

Draw 6
January 30, 1400

Draw 7
January 30, 1900

Draw 8
January 31, 0830

Draw 9
January 31, 1400

Playoffs

C1 vs. C2
January 31, 1900

A vs. B
January 31, 1900

Semi-final
February 1, 0930

Final
February 1, 1400

Saskatchewan
Swift Current
Curling in Saskatchewan